In military terms, 99th Division or 99th Infantry Division may refer to:

 Infantry divisions 

 99th Division (1st Formation) (People's Republic of China)
 99th Division (2nd Formation)(People's Republic of China)
 99th Light Infantry Division (Wehrmacht)
 99th Guards Rifle Division (Soviet Union)
 99th Rifle Division (Soviet Union)
 99th Infantry Division (United States)